Hellfyre Club is an American independent record label based in Los Angeles, California. It was founded and is currently owned by rapper Nocando.

According to Pitchfork Media, it is "an assemblage of West Coast art rap luminaries connected to Project Blowed, a long-running hip hop workshop that served as a proving ground for 90s and aughts L.A. aesthetes from Freestyle Fellowship and Abstract Rude to Pigeon John."

History
Hellfyre Club released Prometheus, a label compilation mixed by DJ Nobody, in March 2011. Another compilation, Veneris Nigrum, followed in November that year. It featured contributions from E.Super, Kail, Subtitle, Rheteric Ramirez, Open Mike Eagle, Pistol McFly, Sahtyre, Nocando, and VerBS. Dorner vs. Tookie, a 17-track compilation, was released on the label in November 2013.

On May 2, 2017, the label released its first project in nearly three years with "The Live I Live" EP by Cadalack Ron.

Roster
 Nocando
 Kail

Former
 Falcons
 Intuition
 Pistol McFly
 Subtitle
 E.Super (Alpha MC, Alwayz Prolific, Duke Westlake, and Kuest 1)
 Flash Bang Grenada (Busdriver and Nocando)
 Kail
 Milo
 Rheteric Ramirez
 Taurus Scott
 VerBS
 Open Mike Eagle
 Busdriver
 Anderson .Paak

Discography
 Prometheus (2011)
 Veneris Nigrum (2011)
 Dorner vs. Tookie (2013)

See also 
 List of record labels
 Underground hip hop

References

External links
 
 

American independent record labels
Hip hop record labels